Demequina activiva is a Gram-positive, facultatively anaerobic, rod-shaped and non-spore-forming bacterium from the genus Demequina which has been isolated from tidal flat sediments from the South Sea in Korea.

References

Micrococcales
Bacteria described in 2015